Achim is a village and a former municipality in the district of Wolfenbüttel, in Lower Saxony, Germany. Since 1 November 2011, it is part of the municipality Börßum.

References

Wolfenbüttel (district)
Villages in Lower Saxony